Dalbergia pseudobaronii is a species of flowering plant in the legume family Fabaceae. It is endemic to Madagascar. Its leaves are similar to those of Dalbergia baronii, which gave the species its name.

Description

Vegetative characters 
Dalbergia pseudobaronii is a deciduous tree up to 25 m tall. The leaves are imparipinnate, 5–13 cm long, and have a hairy rachis. The 20–35 alternate leaflets are 0.5–2.3 cm long, mostly glabrous and glossy above, and densely pubescent beneath. The leaflets are coriaceous, with revolute margins, when dried on herbarium sheets.

Generative characters 
It forms terminal and axillary inflorescences that are paniculate and shorter than the subtending leaves. The flowers are white becoming yellowish, 4–5.5 mm long, and have a violin-shaped standard petal and pubescent gynoecium. The fruits are up to 12 cm long and 5 cm wide (among the largest in Malagasy Dalbergia), and contain a single seed. The pericarp is "net-veined, thickened, corky and fissured over the seed".

Similar species 
 Dalbergia baronii
 Dalbergia humbertii
 Dalbergia monticola

Habitat and distribution 
Dalbergia pseudobaronii occurs in the Diana and Sava regions in north Madagascar. It is mainly found along rivers and streams such as the Manajeba, Mahavavy or Manambato rivers. Fruiting collections have been recorded up to an altitude of 300 m.

Uses 
It produces a high-quality timber that is locally used for cabinet making.

Conservation status 
The IUCN Red List lists Dalbergia pseudobaronii as vulnerable. Habitat loss and selective logging have resulted in population reduction.

Due to overexploitation and the risk of confusion with similar species, Dalbergia pseudobaronii and other Dalbergia species from Madagascar were listed in CITES Appendix II in 2013, currently with a zero export quota.

See also 
 Dalbergia maritima, also found only in Madagascar, and similarly threatened.

References 

pseudobaronii
Endemic flora of Madagascar
Vulnerable plants
Taxonomy articles created by Polbot